Pelham Manor is an affluent village located in Westchester County, New York. As of the 2020 census, the village had a total population of 5,752. It is located in the town of Pelham.

History
The Bolton Priory, Edgewood House, and Pelhamdale are listed on the National Register of Historic Places.

Geography

Climate

Demographics 

As of the census of 2000, there were 5,466 people, 1,862 households, and 1,504 families residing in the village. The population density was 4,121.3 inhabitants per square mile (1,586.8/km2). There were 1,909 housing units at an average density of 1,439.4 per square mile (554.2/km2). The racial makeup of the village was 92.15% White, 2.12% African American, 0.07% Native American, 2.80% Asian, 0.00% Pacific Islander, 1.06% from other races, and 1.79% from two or more races. 4.63% of the population were Hispanic or Latino of any race.

There were 1,862 households, out of which 43.3% had children under the age of 18 living with them, 71.1% were married couples living together, 7.4% had a female householder with no husband present, and 19.2% were non-families. 17.5% of all households were made up of individuals, and 8.2% had someone living alone who was 65 years of age or older. The average household size was 2.93 and the average family size was 3.32.

In the village, the population was spread out, with 31.9% under the age of 19, 4.0% from 18 to 24, 25.4% from 25 to 44, 26.9% from 45 to 64, and 14.0% who were 65 years of age or older. The median age was 40 years. For every 100 females, there were 94.6 males. For every 100 females age 18 and over, there were 86.8 males.

The average household income in the village was $253,261, and the median income for a family was $154,865. Males had a median income of $93,054 versus $52,424 for females. The per capita income for the village was $61,104. 4.3% of the population and 3.1% of families were below the poverty line. Out of the total population, 5.8% of those under the age of 18 and 2.7% of those 65 and older were living below the poverty line.

Economy

Shopping
Four Corners, at the intersection of Boston Post Road (US1) and Pelhamdale Avenue, boasts two mini strip malls, facing each other on either side of Boston Post Road.

Post Road Plaza is a shopping mall located on the Pelham Manor/Bronx border, at 895 Pelham Parkway, at the intersection of Boston Post Road (US 1), Pelham Parkway, and the Hutchinson River Parkway.

Notable people

See also
Philip Pell
Pelhamdale

References

External links 
 

Villages in New York (state)
Villages in Westchester County, New York
Populated coastal places in New York (state)
Pelham, New York